The International University of Sarajevo (IUS) is a private university located in the capital city Sarajevo, Bosnia and Herzegovina. The university was established by the Foundation for the Development of Education in 2004–2005. IUS is open to students from all over the world, and the language of instruction and communication is English. It offers four year education according to Bologna system (model 4+1+3 with B.S. and B.A. diplomas). IUS has 1650 students from 55 countries and faculty members from 20 countries performing academic and research activities in various disciplines of Science, Engineering, Arts and Social Sciences. The first generation of 32 IUS graduates received their diplomas on June 26, 2009. IUS offers many types of scholarships, especially for students from Bosnia and Herzegovina. IUS has both modern and large campus for the region.

University Administration

The president of the board of trustees is Prof. Dr. Sevgi Kurtulmus. Rector is Prof. Dr. Ahmet Yıldırım from the Genetics and Bioengineering program.

Organization
The university comprises the Faculty of Engineering and Natural Sciences, the Faculty of Business and Public Administration, the Faculty of Arts and Social Sciences , the Faculty of Law and the Faculty of Education. IUS also organizes an English Language School (ELS) to provide intensive English Language instruction.

Faculty of Engineering and Natural Science
The Faculty of Engineering and Natural Science (FENS) offers the B.Sc. degrees in  Genetics and Bioengineering (BIO), Computer Science and Engineering (CS), Software Engineering (SE), Electrical and Electronics Engineering (EE), Industrial Engineering (IE), Mechanical Engineering (ME), Architecture (ARCH)

Faculty of Business Administration

The Faculty of Economics and Business Administration (FBA) offers the B.Sc. degrees in Management (MAN), Economics (ECO), International Relations (IR), International Business and Finance (IBF)

Faculty of Arts and Social Sciences
The Faculty of Arts and Social Sciences (FASS) offers the B.Sc. degrees in Visual Arts and Communication Design (VACD), Cultural Studies (CULT), Social and Political Science (SPS), English Language & Literature (ELIT),  Psychology (PSY) 
FASS publishes an online semiannual refereed journal Epiphany that has been added to the Directory of Open Access Journals.

Faculty of Law
The Faculty of Law offers Law Study Program

Faculty of Education
The Faculty of Education offers the B.Sc. degrees in Computer education and Instructional Technology (CEIT), Turkish language and literature, teacher training program (TLT), English language and literature, teacher training program (ELT)

Graduate school
IUS offers master and doctorate programs in Business Administration, Economics, International Relations, Political Science, Cultural Studies, Mechatronics and Systems Engineering, Computer Engineering, English Language and Literature, Psychology, Genetics and Bioengineering, Mechanical engineering, Computer science, Electrical engineering. IUS gave its first doctoral graduated in 2012 from Economics and International Relations programs.

Student activities

IUS students have been involved in various extra-curricular activities, such as actions of voluntary blood donations organised in cooperation with Federal Blood Transfusion Institute of Bosnia-Herzegovina.

In 2009, IUS organised its first Spring Fest. This event will become regular annual gathering that will be taking place in the month of June with the aim of bringing together students and professors in a relaxed manner.

Student clubs 
In the IUS there is many student clubs where students can participate and share their knowledge with their colleagues.

Some of IUS student clubs are: IUS Charity Club, IUSPA - IUS Psychology Association,  IUS Blue Wolves Basketball Organisation,IUS Trekking Club, DEAR VACD Club, IUS Model United Nations Club etc.

Campus

On April 5, 2010, new IUS campus was officially opened by BH Presidency Chairman Dr. Haris Silajdžić and Prime Minister of Republic of Turkey Recep Tayyip Erdoğan. Once the final project of Ilidža Campus is completed, IUS will be the center of excellence in not only Bosnia and Herzegovina but also in the Balkans region to provide high-quality education and research to about 5000 students.

IUS campus has the following places and buildings:

 IUS A building
 IUS B building
 IUS Research and Development Center
 IUS Parking
 IUS Cafe
 IUS Sedef Bosnia Canteen
 IUS Masjid
 IUS Stadium
 IUS Playground
 Mehmet Çakır Dormitory for Girls 
 Plavi Leptir Dormitory for Males

Library 
The Library of the International University of Sarajevo (IUS) aims to be a center of research and main resource for academic curriculum. The main goal of the IUS Library is to meet, support and facilitate scholarly needs and intellectual activities of IUS academic community. It is committed to provide available resources such as textbooks, reference books, and academic journals as well as access to e-resources; to provide the best information services and also a comfortable study environment. IUS Library is located in B building, 3rd floor. ID cards are required at the entrance to the library.

The IUS Library occupies a total area of 500 square meters. There are 162 seats divided as follows:

 main reading room – 70 seats
 group study room – 26 seats
 thesis room with – 10 seats
 study room for PhD students – 10 seat
 ELS reading room – 10 seats
 computer room – 36 seats and 10 PCs

Dormitories 
In June 2009, International University of Sarajevo opened its first campus dormitory building that can accommodate 220 male students. In 2010, dormitory for female students was opened as well.

There are rooms with two and five-beds. Each room has its own bathroom and most of them have their own study space. Wireless Internet connection is provided for the students at the whole Campus area.

References

External links
 

International University of Sarajevo
Educational institutions established in 2004
2004 establishments in Bosnia and Herzegovina